The 2003 V8Star Series season was the third and final V8Star Series season. It featured ten races at four European racing circuits, in Germany and the Netherlands. Portuguese ex-Formula One driver Pedro Lamy was crowned champion of the series, taking five wins in all and beating Germans Thomas Mutsch and Michael Bartels to the title.

Teams and drivers

* Guest driver, no points awarded.

Race calendar and results

Championship standings

References

External links
driverdb.com V8Star Series 2003
speedsport-magazine.com V8Star Series 2003
motorsport-archive.com V8Star Series
V8Star Series official website

V8Star Series
V8Star Series